Ruffy is a locality in Victoria, Australia.

The Post Office opened on 1 April 1881 as Terip Terip, was renamed Ruffy in 1895, and closed in 1974.

Ruffy was the childhood home of Leslie Cecil Maygar, awarded the Victoria Cross in the Second Boer War.

References

External links

Ruffy Community website

Towns in Victoria (Australia)
Shire of Strathbogie
Shire of Murrindindi